Pethia erythromycter is a species of cyprinid fish native to Myanmar where it is found in Myitkyina and Lake Indawgyi.  This species can reach a length of  SL.

References 

Pethia
Fish described in 2008
Fish of Myanmar
Barbs (fish)